Matt Philip (born 7 March 1994) is an Australian rugby union footballer who currently plays as a lock for the Melbourne Rebels. He previously played for the Western Force and also the Perth Spirit in Australia's National Rugby Championship.

Philip previously played for the Sydney Stars in 2014 and 2015, and joined  for the Mitre 10 Cup in 2016.

Early life
Philip hails from New South Wales and represented Australia at schoolboy level in 2012, and  under-20 level in 2014.

Rugby career
Philip initially made his way in the game turning out for Sydney University in the Shute Shield where his form earned him a call-up to the Sydney Stars squad ahead of the inaugural National Rugby Championship in 2014. He made 15 appearances for the Stars across two seasons and scored two tries in that time.

Philip's rise to the Super Rugby level was a swift one as an injury crisis in the Force's second row saw him cross Australia from Sydney to Perth to train with them during the 2016 mid-year rugby union internationals break. He made three substitute appearances in total during the 2016 Super Rugby season. Later in 2016, he joined  in the Mitre 10 Cup.

In 2017, Philip was a first-choice starter at lock for the Force. After his strong performances for Perth Spirit in the NRC, he was invited into the Barbarians team to play Australia in Sydney, and then selected the Australian squad for the 2017 Wallabies tour. He made his test debut for Australia in the team's win against  on 4 November 2017, replacing lock Adam Coleman in the second half.

Super Rugby statistics

References

1994 births
Living people
Australia international rugby union players
Australian rugby union players
Perth Spirit players
Rugby union locks
Western Force players
Sydney Stars players
Southland rugby union players
Australian expatriate rugby union players
Expatriate rugby union players in New Zealand
Melbourne Rebels players
Melbourne Rising players
Expatriate rugby union players in France
Section Paloise players
Rugby union players from New South Wales